Kari Samantha Wuhrer (born April 28, 1967) is an American actress, model, and singer. Wuhrer began her career as a teenager, and is best known for her time as a cast member on MTV's Remote Control, her roles as Maggie Beckett in the television series Sliders, and as Sheriff Samantha Parker in the horror comedy film Eight Legged Freaks.

Early life
Wuhrer was born in Brookfield, Connecticut, the daughter of Karin (née Noble), a payroll accountant, and German-American Andrew Wuhrer, a police officer and car salesman. She has three siblings. As a teenager, she sang in nightclubs, sneaking out of the family home to perform. She studied acting from the age of 13 at the Wooster School, then studied drama at New York University's Tisch School of the Arts, Marymount Manhattan College, Columbia University, and the Royal Academy of Dramatic Art with famed teacher Uta Hagen.

Career
Wuhrer's first television break was MTV's Remote Control (1987). She was a regular cast member of the television series Swamp Thing from 1991 to 1992. She also worked as a VJ on MTV during the same period. In 1993, she was a regular in the TV series Class of '96, where she played college student Robin Farr. From 1994 to 1995, she starred as Ariel Hunter in the long-running primetime soap opera Beverly Hills, 90210.

During this period, she appeared in The Adventures of Ford Fairlane (1990) and starred in Beastmaster 2: Through the Portal of Time (1991).  In 1995, she also had a supporting role in the John Singleton film Higher Learning, followed by Thinner (1996), Anaconda (1997), and Kissing a Fool (1998).

Wuhrer returned to television in 1997 on the series Sliders as Maggie Beckett, joining the cast as a regular and staying until the series ended in 2000.  Wuhrer also guest-starred in the TV series Leverage.

Wuhrer signed a record deal with Rick Rubin, and her only album, Shiny, was released in 1999 by Del-Fi Records. In addition to her singing, she wrote most of the songs on the album and played both the guitar and the flute on several tracks.  Wuhrer made a disastrous appearance on Late Night with Conan O'Brien to promote the album.  She began by joking that she could not stand  comedian Steven Wright, who was already on the stage and looked surprised that she knew him.  Her rambling into random topics was roundly criticized as immature for a 32-year-old who had been in the industry for a long time.

Her later mainstream film roles include Berserker (2001) and Eight Legged Freaks (2002). She was an executive producer of the direct-to-video film Spider's Web, with Stephen Baldwin, of which Wuhrer said: "The pace of making this movie, it was extreme. It was the longest day imaginable".

Wuhrer is also known by gamers for her role as Agent Tanya in cutscenes of Westwood Studios' real-time strategy video game Command & Conquer: Red Alert 2 and its subsequent expansion pack, Yuri's Revenge.

Wuhrer was later voted number 76 on the FHM 100 Sexiest Women of 2000, number  73 in the FHM 100 Sexiest Women in the World of 2001, and number 36 in Maxim magazine's 50 Sexiest Women Countdown of 1999. She posed seminude in Playboy in August 2000 as their Babe of the Month and earlier considered multiple offers to appear fully nude throughout 1998.  She was also No. 64 on Celebrity Skin's 100 Sexiest Stars of All Time and No. 4 in the Celebrity Nudity Database's Most Popular Actresses of 1999.

Her breast implants encapsulated during the filming of Spider's Web, so she had them removed in 2002.

From February 3, 2005, through November 2005, Wuhrer joined the cast of the daytime soap opera General Hospital as FBI Agent Reese Marshall, the former love interest of mobster Sonny Corinthos and former best friend/rival of Carly Corinthos. Wuhrer's character died after suffering injuries in a train wreck. In January 2006, Wuhrer announced that she was suing General Hospital, claiming that she was fired because of her pregnancy.

Filmography

Film

Television

Video games

Awards

References

External links

 
 
 
 
 Kari Wuhrer profile on SoapCentral
 
 
 

1967 births
Living people
Actresses from Connecticut
American people of German descent
American film actresses
American game show hosts
Tisch School of the Arts alumni
American women pop singers
American soap opera actresses
American television actresses
People from Brookfield, Connecticut
VJs (media personalities)
Columbia University alumni
Singers from Connecticut
Marymount Manhattan College alumni
Alumni of RADA
American voice actresses
20th-century American actresses
21st-century American actresses
20th-century American women singers
Del-Fi Records artists
20th-century American singers